Mirny is a rural locality (a passing loop) in Burlinsky Selsoviet, Burlinsky District, Altai Krai, Russia. The population was 1 as of 2013. It was founded in 1955. There is 1 street.

Geography 
Mirny is located 12 km northwest of Burla (the district's administrative centre) by road. Kineral is the nearest rural locality.

References 

Rural localities in Burlinsky District